This article lists the gates of the Old City of Jerusalem. The gates are visible on most old maps of Jerusalem over the last 1,500 years.

During different periods, the city walls followed different outlines and had a varying number of gates. During the era of the crusader Kingdom of Jerusalem (1099-1291), Jerusalem had four gates, one on each side. 

The current walls of the Old City of Jerusalem were built between 1533 and 1540 on orders of Ottoman Sultan Suleiman the Magnificent, who provided them with seven gates: six new gates were built, and the older and previously sealed Golden Gate was reopened (only to be re-sealed again after a few years). The seven gates at the time of Suleiman were, clockwise and by their current name: the Damascus Gate; Herod's Gate; Lions' Gate; Golden Gate; Dung Gate; Zion Gate; and Jaffa Gate.

With the re-sealing of the Golden Gate by Suleiman, the number of operational gates was only brought back to seven in 1887, with the addition of the New Gate.

Until 1887, each gate was closed before sunset and opened at sunrise.

List 
The seven gates at the time of Suleiman were: Damascus Gate; Golden Gate; Herod's Gate; Jaffa Gate; Lions' Gate; Silwan Gate (also known as Mughrabi Gate, and now as Dung Gate); and Zion Gate. With the re-sealing of the Golden Gate, the number of operational gates was brought back to seven with the addition of the New Gate in 1887.

Previous gates 
A smaller entrance, popularly known as the Tanners' Gate, has been opened for visitors after being discovered and unsealed during excavations in the 1990s. 

Sealed historic gates, other than the Golden Gate, comprise three that are at least partially preserved (the Single, Triple, and Double Gates in the southern wall), with several other gates discovered by archaeologists of which only traces remain (the so-called Gate of the Essenes on Mount Zion, the gate of Herod's royal palace south of the citadel, and the vague remains of what 19th-century explorers identified as the Gate of the Funerals (Bab al-Jana'iz) or of al-Buraq (Bab al-Buraq) south of the Golden Gate).

See also
Gates of the Temple Mount
Walls of Jerusalem

References

 
Jerusalem